Arbogast may refer to:

People 
 Arbogast (magister militum), a 4th-century Frankish general
 Arbogast (Count of Trier), a 5th-century Frankish-Roman comes in Trier who may have been Bishop of Chartres
 Arbogast von Franckenstein, a 10th-century knight and sworn defender of the Franckenstein realm
 Carl Arbogast, compiler of the eponymous Arbogast Method used in selection cutting silviculture
 Louis François Antoine Arbogast (1759 – 1803), a French mathematician who published a well-known calculus treatise in 1800
 Saint Arbogast (c. 600s–700), an Irish missionary and Bishop of Strasbourg
Thierry Arbogast, a French cinematographer known for his collaboration with director Luc Besson
 Todd Arbogast, an American mathematician known for his work in subsurface modeling

Characters and fictional entities 
 Carl Arbogast, River Phoenix's character in the film Sneakers
 Chief Dino Arbogast, a senior officer of the New York Police Department in the TV series Blue Bloods
 Dr. Larry Arbogast, Danny DeVito's character in the film Junior
 Detective Milton Arbogast, the investigator in Alfred Hitchcock's film Psycho
 UNS Arboghast, a scientific research spaceship in the TV series The Expanse